Rhodobaenus tredecimpunctatus, known generally as the ironweed curculio or cocklebur weevil, is a species of snout or bark beetle in the family Curculionidae. It is found in North America.

References

Further reading

External links

 

Dryophthorinae
Beetles described in 1794